Things or The Things may refer to:

Music
 Things (album), by Uri Caine and Paolo Fresu, 2006
 "Things" (Bobby Darin song), 1962; covered by Ronnie Dove, 1975
 "Things", a song by Joe Walsh from There Goes the Neighborhood, 1981
 "Things", a song by John Cale from HoboSapiens, 2003
 "Things", a song by Split Enz, 1979
 "Things", a song by Paul Westerberg from 14 Songs, 1993
 "The Things", a song by Audio Bullys from Ego War, 2003

Other uses
 "The Things" (short story), by Peter Watts
 Things (Chill), a 1984 role-playing game supplement
 Things (film), a 1989 Canadian horror film
 Things (software), task management software
 Things: A Story of the Sixties, a 1965 novel by Georges Perec
 The Things, recurring characters in the British adult humour comic Viz
 The Things, Thing One and Thing Two from The Cat in the Hat by Dr Seuss
 T.H.I.N.G.S., a line of games marketed by the Milton Bradley Company

See also 
 Our Thing (disambiguation)
 Thang (disambiguation)
 Thing (disambiguation)
 Thring (disambiguation)
 Thwing (disambiguation)